State Highway 159 (SH 159) is a Texas state highway that runs from La Grange to Fayetteville in Fayette County, through Industry and Bellville in Austin County, and ends at Hempstead in Waller County. The route was designated on March 19, 1930 from SH 73 east to Hempstead as a renumbering of SH 73A. On December 8, 1932, it extended west to northeast of La Grange, replacing part of SH 73, which had been rerouted further south earlier. On September 26, 1939, SH 159 was extended to La Grange, replacing part of SH 237.

Route description
SH 159 begins at Bus. SH 71 in downtown La Grange and heads northeast. The highway intersects with SH 71 on the outskirts of La Grange.

Junction list

References

159
Transportation in Austin County, Texas
Transportation in Fayette County, Texas
Transportation in Waller County, Texas